Checca sauce is an uncooked tomato sauce used with pasta. Pasta alla checca is an Italian pasta dish using fresh, uncooked tomatoes, basil, fresh mozzarella, olive oil, garlic, salt, and pepper, typically prepared in the summer with fresh ripe tomatoes.

References

Italian sauces
Tomato sauces